Odhiambo is a surname. Notable people with the surname include:

 Agnes Odhiambo (accountant), Kenyan accountant and civil servant
 Agnes Odhiambo (activist), Kenyan human rights activist who works at Human Rights Watch
Alfred Odhiambo, Kenyan politician
Bernard Odhiambo, Kenyan footballer
Billy Odhiambo (born 1993), Kenyan rugby sevens player
David Odhiambo (born 1976), Kenyan cricket umpire
Eisha Stephen Atieno Odhiambo (1945–2009), Kenyan academic
Eric Odhiambo (born 1989), English footballer
Kennedy Odhiambo, Kenyan footballer
Moses Odhiambo (born 1986), Kenyan footballer
Nehemiah Odhiambo (born 1984), Kenyan cricketer
Nelson Odhiambo (born 1989), Kenyan cricketer
Okot Odhiambo, also known as Two Victor, his radio call sign, a senior leader of the Lord's Resistance Army, a Ugandan rebel group
Peter Amollo Odhiambo, Kenyan consultant thoracic and cardiovascular surgeon
Peter Odhiambo (born 1966), Kenyan boxer
Rees Odhiambo (born 1992), American football player in the NFL 
Sunday Odhiambo, Kenyan footballer
Sylvester Odhiambo, Kenyan association football coach 
Thomas R. Odhiambo (1931–2003), Kenyan entomologist and environmental activist